The R629 road is a regional road in southeast County Cork, Ireland. It travels from the R630 road at Ballinacurra's grotto, southeastwards through Kearney's Cross and Cloyne (where it turns eastwards), past Ballymaloe House and Shanagarry, into Ballycotton. The statutary definition gives it as beginning at the R907 in Midleton, but all maps and other material assign the Midleton–Ballinacurra stretch to the R630 instead.

References

Regional roads in the Republic of Ireland
Roads in County Cork